Prodigal Son is the eighth studio album released by The Saints.  It was released in 1988.

Track listing 

All tracks composed by Chris Bailey; except where indicated
 "Grain of Sand" – 3:49
 "Fire and Brimstone" – 3:27
 "Friend of the People" – 3:16
 "Before Hollywood" – 3:40
 "Sold Out" – 3:20
 "Ghost Ships" – 3:51
 "Massacre" – 2:48
 "Tomorrow" – 3:32
 "Stay" – 3:46
 "Shipwreck" – 3:35
 "Music Goes 'Round My Head" (Harry Vanda, George Young) – 3:34 (CD Bonus Track in Australia)
The CD release featured a cover of The Easybeats song "Music Goes 'Round My Head" at the end of the album.  This was recorded for the soundtrack of the Australian film Young Einstein.  For the US release, the song was the second track on the album.  The streaming release features the original Australian CD release track listing.

Charts

Personnel
The Saints
 Barrington Francis – guitar
 Arturo LaRizza – bass, string and horn arrangements
 Chris Bailey - vocals, guitar
 Joe Chiofalo – keyboards
 Iain Shedden – drums, percussion
Technical
 Beth Cumber – art direction
 Ian White – art direction
 Brian McGee – mixing
 Harry Vanda – producer (on "Music Goes Round My Head" only)
 George Young – producer (on "Music Goes Round My Head" only)
 Mark Opitz – remixing

References

The Saints (Australian band) albums
1988 albums
Mushroom Records albums